The list of Game & Watch games released by Nintendo, includes format and date of release. Several were collected and re-released as ports for the Game & Watch Gallery series for Game Boy, Game Boy Color, and Game Boy Advance. They were re-released in the Nintendo Mini Classics series in the late 1990s. Digital recreations in DSiWare were released for Nintendo DSi in 2009 (2010 internationally) and for Nintendo 3DS in 2011.

Series

Silver

Gold

Wide Screen

Vertical Multi Screen

Horizontal Multi Screen

New Wide Screen

Table Top

Panorama

Super Color

Micro Vs. System

Crystal Screen

Color Screen

Untitled special models

Games

Ball

Ball (originally known as Toss-Up in North America) was released in the Silver series on April 28, 1980. It is the first Game & Watch game, and is a single-screen single-player game.

In Game A, the player tosses two balls in the air. As the balls fall, the player must catch and toss them up again. One point is earned for each successful catch. A dropped ball will display a broken ball and end the game. The object is to continuously catch the balls that fall and throw them back up, as in juggling. In Game B, the player must juggle three balls, and each successful catch rewards ten points instead of one.

It was re-released exclusively via Club Nintendo to celebrate the 30th anniversary of Game & Watch, with the Club Nintendo logo on the back. Unlike the original release, this version includes an option to mute the game by pressing the Time button during gameplay. For members of the Japanese Club Nintendo, after an announcement in November 2009, it was shipped in April 2010 to Platinum members. For members of the North American Club Nintendo, it was available for 1200 coins from February 2011. For members of the European Club Nintendo, it was available for 7500 stars from November 2011.

Ball was recreated in Game Boy Gallery for Game Boy and Game & Watch Gallery 2 for Game Boy Color. It was recreated as a DSiWare game that was released for Nintendo DSi on July 15, 2009 in Japan, on April 19, 2010 in the United States and April 23, 2010 in Europe; and for Nintendo 3DS on July 7, 2011 in Europe. It also appears as a minigame for the Game Boy Camera, where players can paste images of their own face over that of the juggler.

In the Super Smash Bros. series, Mr. Game & Watch's throws reference Ball.

Flagman

Flagman (originally known as Flag Man in North America) was released in the Silver series on June 5, 1980. It is a single-screen single-player game.

The object is to repeat the pattern of numbers on the flags held up by the on-screen character Mr. Game & Watch. A life is lost each time the player pushes the wrong button or hits the correct number too late. The game ends when three lives are lost. Game B requires the character to push the right number as quickly as possible, before time runs out.

Flagman was recreated in Game Boy Gallery for Game Boy and Game & Watch Gallery 3 for Game Boy Color. A version of Flagman becomes available in Wario Land II once the player has achieved 100% completion of the game. It is included in WarioWare: Touched! as a microgame called Flagman Game & Watch. It was recreated as a DSiWare game that was released for Nintendo DSi on July 15, 2009 in Japan, on April 19, 2010 in the United States and April 23, 2010 in Europe; and for Nintendo 3DS on July 7, 2011 in Europe.

In the Super Smash Bros. series, Mr. Game & Watch has an attack which has him hit opponents with a flag, referencing Flagman.

Vermin

Vermin (originally known as The Exterminator in North America) was released in the Silver series on July 10, 1980 with 500,000 units sold. It is a single-screen single-player game.

In Vermin, moles pop out of the ground and try to get into the player's garden. The player has to hit the moles with a hammer to keep them out of the garden.

Vermin was recreated in Game Boy Gallery and Game & Watch Gallery for Game Boy and Game & Watch Gallery 2 for Game Boy Color. In WarioWare, Inc.: Mega Microgame$!, there is a microgame called "Vermin" in which Wario has to whack a mole with a hammer. It was recreated as a DSiWare game that was released for Nintendo DSi on July 15, 2009 in Japan, on April 5, 2010 in the United States and April 9, 2010 in Europe; and for Nintendo 3DS on July 7, 2011 in Europe.

In the Super Smash Bros. series, Mr. Game & Watch has several attacks which has him hit opponents on either side with two hammers, referencing Vermin.

Fire

Fire (originally known as Fireman Fireman in North America) was released in the Silver series on July 31, 1980, and in the Wide Screen series on December 4, 1981. It is a single-screen single-player game.

The player controls two firemen who carry a trampoline and must catch people who fall from a burning building and bounce them into a waiting ambulance. In the original Silver series, the player is awarded 1 point for each person who reaches the ambulances, while in the Widescreen, the player is awarded 1 point every time a person is bounced the trampoline, and loses one of their three lives for each person who hits the ground.

Fire was recreated in Game & Watch Gallery for Game Boy, Game & Watch Gallery 3 for Game Boy Color and Game & Watch Gallery 4 for Game Boy Advance. It was also rereleased in the Mini Classics series.

In the Super Smash Bros. series, Mr. Game & Watch has a move called "Fire", which has two firemen launch him upwards with a trampoline, referencing Fire. In Super Smash Bros. Brawl and Super Smash Bros. for Nintendo 3DS and Wii U, he then floats down with a parachute, referencing Parachute. In Super Smash Bros. Brawl and Super Smash Bros. for Nintendo 3DS, the stage Flat Zone 2 shifts between several layouts, one of which is based on Fire. In Super Smash Bros. for Wii U, the stage Flat Zone X shifts between several layouts, one of which is based on Fire.

Judge

Judge was released in the Silver series on October 4, 1980. It is a single-screen game for either 1 or 2 players.

Players control two figures who hold hammers in their hands and hold up numbers. The one with the higher number must attack, and the one with the lower number must flee. An attack may be performed before the number is held up, as a gamble.

Judge was recreated in Game & Watch Gallery 3 for Game Boy Color. It was recreated as a DSiWare game that was released on July 15, 2009 in Japan, on March 22, 2010 in the United States and on March 26, 2010 in Europe; and for Nintendo 3DS on July 7, 2011 in Europe.

In the Super Smash Bros. series, Mr. Game & Watch has a move called "Judge", which has him hit opponents with a hammer that has an additional effect dependent on a random number from 1 to 9 that appears above his head, referencing Judge.

Manhole

Manhole was released in the Gold series on January 29, 1981, and in the New Wide Screen series on August 23, 1983. It is the first game in the Gold series. It is a single-screen single-player game.

The player must prevent pedestrians from falling into one of four sewers by temporarily bridging the open gaps with a manhole cover.

The New Wide Screen version of Manhole was recreated in Game Boy Gallery and Game & Watch Gallery for Game Boy and Game & Watch Gallery 4 for Game Boy Advance. This version of Manhole was one of the cards included with purchase of the Nintendo e-Reader. The New Wide Screen version of Manhole was recreated as a DSiWare game that was released on August 19, 2009 in Japan, on April 5, 2010 in the United States and April 9, 2010 in Europe; and for Nintendo 3DS on July 7, 2011 in Europe.

In Warioware Gold, Manhole is one of the unlockable minigames.

In the Super Smash Bros. series, Mr. Game & Watch has an attack which has him hit opponents with a manhole cover, referencing Manhole. In Super Smash Bros. Melee, the stage Flat Zone is based on a number of Game & Watch games, including Manhole. In Super Smash Bros. Brawl and Super Smash Bros. for Nintendo 3DS, the stage Flat Zone 2 shifts between several layouts, one of which is based on Manhole. In Super Smash Bros. for Wii U, the stage Flat Zone X shifts between several layouts, one of which is based on Manhole.

Helmet

Helmet, known as Headache in the United Kingdom, was released in the Gold series on February 21, 1981. It is a single-screen single-player game.

Tools fall from the sky, but there is a house on the right side of the screen. The player must guide the character towards the house, and dodge the tools until the door opens.

Helmet was recreated in Game & Watch Gallery 2 for Game Boy Color. It was recreated as a DSiWare game that was released for Nintendo DSi on July 29, 2009 in Japan, on April 5, 2010 in the United States and April 9, 2010 in Europe; and for Nintendo 3DS on July 7, 2011 in Europe.

In the Super Smash Bros. series, Mr. Game & Watch has an attack which has him hit opponents with a helmet, referencing Helmet. In Super Smash Bros. Melee, the stage Flat Zone is based on a number of Game & Watch games, including Helmet. In Super Smash Bros. for Wii U, the stage Flat Zone X shifts between several layouts, one of which is based on Helmet.

Lion

Lion was released in the Gold series on April 29, 1981. It is a single-screen single-player game with a maroon body and a gold faceplate.

The player is a lion tamer who must prevent the lion from escaping from its cage.

Lion was ported to Game & Watch Gallery 3 for Game Boy Color.

In the Super Smash Bros. series, Mr. Game & Watch has an attack which has him hit opponents with a chair, referencing Lion. In Super Smash Bros. Brawl and Super Smash Bros. for Nintendo 3DS, the stage Flat Zone 2 shifts between several layouts, one of which is based on Lion. In Super Smash Bros. for Wii U and Super Smash Bros. Ultimate, the stage Flat Zone X shifts between several layouts, one of which is based on Lion.

Parachute

Parachute was released in the Wide Screen series on June 19, 1981. It is the first game in the Wide Screen series. It is a single-screen single-player game.

The player controls a character in a boat and has to prevent parachutists from landing in shark-infested waters. A life is lost every time the player fails to do this. In Game B, the parachutes can get stuck in trees.

Parachute was recreated in Game & Watch Gallery 2 for Game Boy Color, Game & Watch Gallery 4 for Game Boy Advance, and Game & Watch Collection 2 for the Nintendo DS (a Club Nintendo-exclusive).

In Super Smash Bros. Melee, Mr. Game & Watch's neutral air has him opens a parachute, referencing Parachute. In Super Smash Bros. Brawl onward, after performing "Fire" in the same way as in Super Smash Bros. Melee, he then floats down with a parachute, referencing Parachute.

In March 2010, Takara Tomy released officially licensed Game & Watch-styled keychains based on three different Wide Screen Game & Watch models, one of which was Parachute. It does not actually run the game, instead just displaying a demo screen. While the game cannot be played, the speed at which the demo runs can be adjusted. The batteries are recharged with solar panels on the unit.

Octopus

Octopus, known as Mysteries of the Sea and Mysteries of the Deep in the United Kingdom, was released in the Wide Screen series on July 16, 1981. It is a single-screen single-player game.

The object is to recover treasure from a sunken ship without getting caught by an octopus. The player must aim their diver under water by jumping off the side of a boat. Each time the octopus touches the player, one life is lost. A point is awarded for each portion of treasure retrieved from a sunken ship, and three additional points are awarded for evading the octopus a second time and returning to the boat. The game speeds as it progresses, and additional lives are granted at 200 and 500 points. In Game B, the octopus is quicker and there are more hazards.

Octopus was recreated in Game & Watch Gallery for Game Boy, Game & Watch Gallery 4 for Game Boy Advance and Game & Watch Collection 2 for the Nintendo DS (a Club Nintendo-exclusive). It was also rereleased in the Mini Classics series.

In the Super Smash Bros. series, Mr. Game & Watch up smash has him hit opponents with a diving helmet, referencing Octopus. In Super Smash Bros. Brawl, Super Smash Bros. for Nintendo 3DS and Wii U and Super Smash Bros. Ultimate Mr. Game & Watch's Final Smash is "Octopus", which has him transform into the octopus and hit opponents with his tentacles, referencing Octopus while in Super Smash Bros. Ultimate he instead grabs the opponents and drags them offscreen. In Nintendo Land, the octopus and the diver appear in the Octopus Dance minigame.

In March 2010, Takara Tomy released officially licensed Game & Watch-styled keychains based on three different Wide Screen Game & Watch models, one of which was Octopus. It does not actually run the game, instead just displaying a demo screen. While the game cannot be played, the speed at which the demo runs can be adjusted. The batteries are recharged with solar panels on the unit.

Popeye

Popeye was released in the Wide Screen series on August 5, 1981, in the Table Top series on August 17, 1983, and in the Panorama series on August 30, 1983. It is a single-screen single-player game. Hirokazu Tanaka composed the music.

The player controls Popeye, who has to catch objects thrown by Olive Oyl while at the same time avoiding Bluto's attacks. If Popeye is upright in the center of the boat, he is safe from Bluto's attacks, but he may miss objects thrown by Olive Oyl. The game speeds up as it progresses, and Olive Oyl will start throwing more than one objects at the same time.

The Panorama Screen and the Table Top versions are different from the Wide Screen version. In these versions, Popeye must fight to save Olive Oyl, who has been captured by Bluto. Each time Popeye defeats Bluto, a Spinach Can will appear near Olive Oyl. After three fights, She kicks the can to Popeye to help him defeat Bluto, and save her.

Chef

Chef was released in the Wide Screen series on September 4, 1981. It is a single-screen single-player game.

The player controls a chef who flips various pieces of food, including sausage and fish, into the air with a pan. Failure to keep the food airborne causes a mouse to steal the food off the floor and the player to use up one miss. The game ends with the player's third miss. A cat often pokes the left piece of food, which holds it in place for a small amount of time and makes it harder for the player to guess when the piece will be flippable. The game speeds up as it progresses. In Game A, the player must flip three items of food. In Game B, the player must flip four food items.

Chef was recreated in Game & Watch Gallery 2 for Game Boy Color, and Game & Watch Gallery 4 for Game Boy Advance. It is unlockable in Personal Trainer: Cooking for the Nintendo DS after the player has cooked a certain number of meals. It was recreated as a DSiWare game that was released on July 29, 2009 in Japan, on March 22, 2010 in the United States, and March 26, 2010 in Europe; and for Nintendo 3DS on July 7, 2011 in Europe.

In the Super Smash Bros. series, Mr. Game & Watch has a move called "Chef", which has him flip food out of pan, referencing Chef. In Super Smash Bros. Brawl and Super Smash Bros. for Nintendo 3DS, the stage Flat Zone 2 shifts between several layouts, one of which is based on Chef. In Super Smash Bros. for Wii U, the stage Flat Zone X shifts between several layouts, one of which is based on Chef.

In March 2010, Takara Tomy released officially licensed Game & Watch-styled keychains based on three different Wide Screen models, one of which is Chef. It only displays a non-playable demo screen with adjustable speed. Its solar panel recharges its batteries.

Mickey Mouse

Mickey Mouse was released in the Wide Screen series on October 9, 1981, and in the Panorama series on February 28, 1984. It is a single-screen single-player game.

In the Wide Screen version, the player controls Mickey Mouse whose task is to catch eggs as they roll down four slopes, two on either side of the screen. If an egg is dropped, it lands on the floor and is registered as a miss. The eggs roll faster as the total caught count increases, but temporarily slow down upon reaching multiples of 100. The misses are reset at 200 and 500 caught eggs. Missing three eggs between resets will end the game. Periodically, Minnie Mouse peers out of the window; if Mickey misses an egg while Minnie is present onscreen, the miss counts as half and the egg releases a chick who walks away off screen. This half-miss is displayed as a blinking miss symbol.
In Game A eggs roll from three of four slopes, the inactive slope depends on the current miss count. In Game B eggs roll from all four slopes, the number and rate of descent of eggs is higher than in Game A. The gameplay is similar to Egg.

The Panorama version is completely different, where the player controls Mickey Mouse, who is performing acrobatics in a circus. The player must move Mickey left and right to catch batons, whilst avoiding flaming torches. The speed the objects fall increases upon the total score closing in on multiples of 100. If the player misses a baton or touches a flaming torch, a life is lost. After three lives are lost, the game ends. Once the player reaches 300 points, all misses are cancelled. If the player has no misses, they will receive double points until the next miss. The gameplay is similar to Donkey Kong Circus.

Egg

Egg was released in the Wide Screen series on October 14, 1981. It is a single-screen single-player game.

The player character is a wolf who waits outside a hen house. The wolf must catch the eggs that fall out of the side of the hen house, for one point each. Three lives are given. A life is lost for each egg missed, or half of a life if the egg is missed while a hen appears. The game ends when all three lives are lost. The gameplay is the same as Mickey Mouse in the Wide Screen series.

Egg was recreated in Game & Watch Gallery 3 for Game Boy Color.

Turtle Bridge

Turtle Bridge was released in the Wide Screen series on February 1, 1982. It is a single-screen single-player game.

The player uses a line of five turtles as stepping stones to transfer baggage from one side of a river to the other. Once a package is tossed to a colleague on the other side, the player can return to the home bank to fetch the next package. The turtles are not motionless but will dive to feed on any fish within reach, and they dive more frequently as the game progresses. The player may need to wait for the colleague on the far bank and cannot return to the home bank while carrying a package. Two to twelve points are awarded, depending on how quickly the package is delivered. It takes approximately 1 hour of game play to accrue 1000 points. Unlike other similar games, the scoreboard can display scores past 1000. Lives are lost if the explorer lands on a turtle that dives. A life can be recovered at the score levels 200 and 500. The game ends when all lives are lost.

In Game A, the middle turtle of the five has no fish swimming in reach and never dives unless the explorer waits too long on its back, at which point fish appear and the turtle dives. In Game B, all turtles will dive from the outset, and the colleague appears less frequently.

Turtle Bridge was recreated in Game & Watch Gallery 3 for Game Boy Color.

In the Super Smash Bros. series, Mr. Game & Watch back air has him hit opponents with a turtle, referencing Turtle Bridge.

Fire Attack

Fire Attack was released in the Wide Screen series on March 19, 1982. It is a single-screen single-player game.

The main character uses a tomahawk-type weapon to protect a fort from burning. The top row of enemies are tribal chiefs who throw firesticks, and the bottom row of enemies are traditional Game & Watch characters who try to set fire to the fort with a match. Two points are earned for each fire blocked. Three misses are allowed, which occur each time the fort catches fire. All misses are erased at 200 points and again at 500; if there are not any misses at these times, 5 points are awarded per hit for a period of time.

Fire Attack was recreated in Game & Watch Gallery 4 for Game Boy Advance, although, the Game Boy Advance version of the "Legacy Mode" was censored, due to outdated stereotypes, being turned into generic "Bandits".

In the Super Smash Bros. series, Mr. Game & Watch has an attack which has him hit opponents with a fire stick, referencing Fire Attack. In Super Smash Bros. Ultimate, Mr. Game & Watch's animations were updated to reflect individual frames from the original games, including gaining a feathered headband when using the move based on Fire Attack. The controversy following this discovery prompted Nintendo to apologize for the potentially offensive stereotype and announce that the animation would be changed in a post-release patch.

Snoopy Tennis

Snoopy Tennis was released in the Wide Screen series on April 28, 1982. It was rereleased in the Nintendo Mini Classics series.

Charlie Brown throws and hits a ball toward Snoopy, who must hit the ball back. Lucy sometimes will hit the ball to Snoopy.

Oil Panic

Oil Panic was released in the Multi Screen series on May 28, 1982. It is the first game in the Multi Screen series. It is a dual-screen single-player game with a white case. It opens like a clamshell, with an upper and lower screen.

The player controls a station helper who uses a bucket to catch drops of oil from a leaking pipe and empties the bucket into an oil drum. Missing a drop from the pipe or missing the oil drum causes the player to lose a life. The player has four lives, rather than the usual three.

Oil Panic was recreated in Game & Watch Gallery for Game Boy and Game & Watch Collection for the Nintendo DS (a Club Nintendo-exclusive). Oil Panic is also one of the microgames featured in the collection presented by 9 Volt in WarioWare: Touched!. In Europe, it was also rereleased in the Mini Classics series.

In the Super Smash Bros. series, Mr. Game & Watch has a move called "Oil Panic", where he collects energy-based attacks in an oil bucket to throw at opponents as oil later, referencing Oil Panic. In Super Smash Bros. Melee, the stage Flat Zone is based on a number of Game & Watch games, including Manhole. In Super Smash Bros. Brawl and Super Smash Bros. for Nintendo 3DS, the stage Flat Zone 2 shifts between several layouts, one of which is based on Oil Panic. In Super Smash Bros. for Wii U, the stage Flat Zone X shifts between several layouts, one of which is based on Oil Panic.

Donkey Kong

Donkey Kong was released in the Multi Screen series on June 3, 1982. It is a dual-screen single-player game with an orange clamshell body. It is the first use of the directional pad or D-pad.

The Game & Watch version of Donkey Kong sold  units.

Donkey Kong was recreated in Game & Watch Gallery 2 for Game Boy Color, 'Game & Watch Gallery 4 for Game Boy Advance, and Game & Watch Collection for the Nintendo DS (a Club Nintendo-exclusive). It was rereleased in the Nintendo Mini Classics series.

Donkey Kong Jr.Donkey Kong Jr. was released in the New Wide Screen series on October 26, 1982, in the Table Top series on April 28, 1983, and in the Panorama series on October 4, 1983. It is the first game in the New Wide Screen series. It is a single-screen single-player game. Hirokazu Tanaka composed the music.Donkey Kong Jr. was recreated in Game & Watch Gallery 3 for Game Boy Color, and Game & Watch Gallery 4 for Game Boy Advance. It was recreated as a DSiWare game that was released for Nintendo DSi on August 19, 2009 in Japan, on April 19, 2010 in the United States and April 23, 2010 in Europe, and for Nintendo 3DS on July 7, 2011 in Europe. It was rereleased in the Nintendo Mini Classics.

In the Super Smash Bros. series, Mr. Game & Watch has an attack which has him hit opponents with a key, referencing Donkey Kong Jr..

Mickey & DonaldMickey & Donald was released in the Multi Screen series on November 12, 1982. It is a dual-screen single-player game, with a clamshell case. Hirokazu Tanaka composed the music.

The goal is put out the fire in a three-story apartment building as quickly as possible. Donald operates the hose, while Mickey runs the pump. Bulges in the hose give more water for Donald to use, but require Mickey to leave the pump to stop leaks.

Green HouseGreen House was released in the Multi Screen series on December 15, 1982. It is a dual-screen single-player game with a clamshell case.

The object is to protect the flowers at each corner of the screen from enemies using a can of bug spray. Worms attack the top flowers while spiders approach the bottom flowers. The game ends when three flowers have been eaten.Green House was recreated in Game & Watch Gallery 3 for Game Boy Color and Game & Watch Collection for the Nintendo DS (a Club Nintendo-exclusive).

In the Super Smash Bros. series, Mr. Game & Watch has an attack which has him spray opponents with a can of bug spray, referencing Green House.

This is the first appearance of Stanley the Bugman, the lead character in the 1983 arcade game Donkey Kong 3.

Donkey Kong IIDonkey Kong II was released as a part of the Multi Screen series on March 7, 1983. It is a dual-screen single-player game. It has a brown clamshell body. Hirokazu Tanaka composed the music.Donkey Kong II was recreated in Game & Watch Gallery 3 for Game Boy Color.

Mario Bros.Mario Bros. was released in the Multi Screen series on March 14, 1983. It is a dual-screen single-player game. It has a maroon clamshell body. It opens like a Japanese book (to the right), with a left and right screen.

Mario and Luigi are working in a bottling plant, on either side of several stacked conveyor belts. The object of the game is to move boxes of bottles through the machine without dropping any. Each brother can climb a ladder to one of three positions. Mario receives a box at the bottom right, and must be in his lowest position to move it into the bottling machine. The box moves left through the machine, to Luigi, who must be in his lowest position to move it to the next level, which moves it to the right, to Mario's middle position, who raises it to the next level. The box moves to Luigi's middle position, then to Mario's highest position, and finally to Luigi's highest position, where Luigi throws the box onto a truck. When the truck is full, the Brothers have a short break, before getting back to work. Successfully moving a box up one level earns the player 1 point, and loading the truck with eight boxes earns 10 points, for a total of 58 points for all the boxes in the truck. However, if a Brother is not there to catch a box, it falls to the floor and breaks, angering the Brothers' supervisor, resulting in a miss. The third miss ends the game.Mario Bros. was recreated in Game & Watch Gallery 3 for Game Boy Color, and Game & Watch Gallery 4 for Game Boy Advance.

In the Super Smash Bros. series until Super Smash Bros. Ultimate, Mr. Game & Watch's forward air has him hit opponents with a package, referencing Mario Bros. One of his taunts from Super Smash Bros. for Nintendo 3DS and Wii U onward also references the game where he sits and sighs, referencing Mario and Luigi completing a level.

Mario's Cement FactoryMario's Cement Factory was released in the Table Top series on April 28, 1983 and in the New Wide Screen series on June 8, 1983. It is the first game in the Table Top series. It is a single-screen single-player game. Hirokazu Tanaka designed the sounds.Mario's Cement Factory was recreated in Game Boy Gallery for Game Boy and Game & Watch Gallery 4 for Game Boy Advance. It was recreated as a DSiWare game that was released for Nintendo DSi on August 19, 2009 in Japan on March 22, 2010 in the United States, and March 26, 2010 in Europe, and for Nintendo 3DS on July 7, 2011 in Europe. It was rereleased in the Nintendo Mini Classics.

In the Super Smash Bros. series, Mr. Game & Watch grabs opponents with a similar pose to how Mario grabs levers, referencing Mario's Cement Factory.

SnoopySnoopy was released in the Table Top series on June 5, 1983, and in the Panorama series on August 30, 1983. It is the first game in the Panorama series. It is a single-screen single-player game. Hirokazu Tanaka composed the music.

When Game A or Game B is pressed, an introductory sequence plays, and after that, the player controls Snoopy to move on different colored platforms. He then must whack the corresponding colored music notes coming from Schroeder's piano before they reach Woodstock and his friends. Failing to whack them in time or going too far to the left or right will make the player earn a miss. After 100 points, Lucy will wake up and attack Schroeder, stunning him for a few seconds.

Rain ShowerRain Shower was released in the Multi Screen series on August 9, 1983. It is a dual-screen single-player game. It opens like a book, with a left and right screen.

The player moves clothing away from falling raindrops by pulling on a clothes line. In Game B, a bird may swoop down and move the clothing.Rain Shower was recreated in Game & Watch Gallery 4 for Game Boy Advance.

LifeboatLifeboat was released in the Multi Screen series on October 27, 1983. It is a dual-screen single-player game. Its light orange case opens like a book, with a left and right screen.

A burning oceanliner is displayed, and the player pulls a raft through shark-infested waters to catch the people who fall from the ship. The rafts can hold up to 4 people, and can be emptied no matter how many people are in them. A point is awarded for each rescue. The alarm on is indicated by a bucket of water on the cliffside, and when it goes off, a man uses the bucket to attempt to douse the fire.

Game A mode controls two rafts, one on each side of the screen, which move together when the left and right buttons are pressed. In Game B there is only one raft, which can move from
one side of the screen to the other.Lifeboat was recreated in Game & Watch Gallery 4 for Game Boy Advance.

Mario's Bombs AwayMario's Bombs Away was released in the Panorama series on November 4, 1983. It is a single-screen single-player game. It features an unlit color LCD screen that faces downward to expose the translucent rear to an external light source, such as daylight. Hirokazu Tanaka composed the music.

The player character is a military-clad Mario who delivers bombs from left to right, and must keep them away from flaming oil spills and enemy torches. Action is viewed in a mirror that reflects the screen.Mario's Bombs Away was recreated in Game & Watch Gallery 4 for Game Boy Advance.

PinballPinball was released in the Multi Screen series on December 5, 1983. It is a dual-screen single-player game, with a clamshell case. Hirokazu Tanaka composed the music.

The player controls two flippers on the bottom screen and two on the top screen. Other pinball objects include bumpers, outlanes, rollover lanes, kickbacks and plungers.

Spitball SparkySpitball Sparky was released in the Super Color series on February 6, 1984. It is the first game in the Super Color series. It is a single-screen single-player game. Hirokazu Tanaka composed the music.Spitball Sparky works similarly to Breakout, where a ball moves across the screen and is propelled by the player, blowing it upwards as long it is directly above the player in the purple space. If all blocks are eliminated fast enough, a bonus bar at the top would add 5 points per segment, the most being 20 points. Along the top row are red blocks, which require two hits to destroy. If the player eliminates all but the red blocks, and then hits each red block once to make them flash, it awards more bonus points.Spitball Sparky was recreated in Game & Watch Gallery 3 for Game Boy Color.

In the Super Smash Bros. series, Mr. Game & Watch's up air has him blow opponents upwards, referencing Spitball Sparky.

Crab GrabCrab Grab was released in the Super Color series on February 20, 1984. It is a single-screen single-player game.

Crabs emerge from four differently colored columns along the bottom of the screen, and settle at the top. The objective is to avoid being in front of the crab, and to push the crabs from the bottom to prevent them from mounting on the screen. Points are earned by pushing and eliminating crabs. The game ends when the player has been bitten three times. Player movement is in all four directions (Up, Down, Left, Right). The A & B games had similar objectives, but with slightly different speeds.

BoxingBoxing, known as Punch-Out!! in the United States, was released in the Micro Vs. series on July 31, 1984. It is the first game in the Micro Vs. series. It is a single-screen two-player game.

It is similar to Urban Champion, although it was released shortly before the NES game.Boxing was recreated in Game & Watch Gallery 4 for Game Boy Advance.

Donkey Kong 3Donkey Kong 3 was released in the Micro Vs. series on August 20, 1984.Donkey Kong 3 was recreated in Game & Watch Gallery 4 for Game Boy Advance.

Donkey Kong CircusDonkey Kong Circus was released in the Panorama series on March 2, 1984. It is a single-screen two-player game with a lilac body. The gameplay is similar to Mickey Mouse in the Panorama series.

Donkey Kong HockeyDonkey Kong Hockey was released as a part of the Micro Vs. series on November 13, 1984. It is a single-screen two-player game.

Black JackBlack Jack was released as a part of the Multi Screen series on February 15, 1985. It is a dual-screen single-player game. Its maroon clamshell body has an upper and lower screen.

Game A is a blackjack game. The dealer's hand is on the upper screen and the player's hand is on the bottom screen. Four buttons are available: double down, bet ×10/hit, bet ×1/stand and enter. The player starts with a $500 bankroll and can bet up to $100 each hand. Pair splitting is not allowed, and bets must be locked before shuffling is done, contrary to real-world blackjack rules.

In Game B, the player starts with $500 as five numbers cycle on the bottom screen. Pressing the enter button causes the numbers to stop one at a time. There is a $50 reward if all five stop on the same number, or a deduction of $25 if not.

Tropical FishTropical Fish was released in the New Wide Screen series on July 8, 1985. It is a single-screen single-player game.

The player uses a fishbowl to catch fish that jump out of a tank and must move them into a tank on the other side. The game ends when three fish are missed.Tropical Fish was recreated in Game & Watch Gallery 4 for Game Boy Advance.

In Super Smash Bros. Brawl and Super Smash Bros. for Nintendo 3DS and Wii U, Mr. Game & Watch has an attack which has him hit opponents with a fish bowl, referencing Tropical Fish.

SquishSquish was released in the Multi Screen series on April 17, 1986. It is a dual-screen single-player game, with a clamshell case and an upper and lower screen. It is similar to Devil World.

Super Mario Bros.Super Mario Bros. was released in the Crystal Screen series on June 25, 1986, and in the New Wide Screen series on March 8, 1988. It is the first game in the Crystal Screen series. It is a single-screen single-player game.

Mario traverses levels to save Princess Toadstool (also known as Peach), as in the NES game Super Mario Bros. (1985).

It was a prize for the Famicon's F-1 Grand Prix tournament on August 1, 1987 with the code YM-901-S. It is a single-screen single-player game with a yellow case. It came in a plastic box modeled after Disk-kun, the Famicom Disk System mascot. This edition is the rarest of all Game & Watch models, with only 10,000 units produced and never available at retail. It was rereleased in the Nintendo Mini Classics 1998 series.

ClimberClimber was released in the Crystal Screen series on July 4, 1986, and in the New Wide Screen series on March 8, 1988. It is a single-screen single-player game. It is similar to Ice Climber.

A boy known as the Climber sets out for the Block Mountain where the Blockmen live to train as a warrior. Lord Meiji, who he meets on the way, grants him a pair of boots which enable him to jump very high, armor that can break ceilings, and a head band which will help him find a sword that can defeat Dragalo the Dragon. The climber pursues his quest with the assistance of the mysterious bird Hentori. The objective of the game is to control Climber by jumping through a tower of platforms and landing on them, and by avoiding monsters and blockmen. The goal is to either grab Hentori or slash Dragalo while achieving the highest score possible.Climber was recreated in Game & Watch Gallery 4 for Game Boy Advance.

Balloon FightBalloon Fight was released in the Crystal Screen series on November 19, 1986, and in the New Wide Screen series on March 8, 1988. It is a single-screen single-player game.

This game is modeled after the Balloon Trip mode of the NES version. The screen auto-scrolls from the left, and the player must collect balloons while avoiding airborne sparks. The player controls a "Balloon Man" who is chasing an escaped criminal known as Oiram Repus. Every eight phases, there is a boss fight against Oiram Repus, where the player must avoid a pattern of sparks for an amount of time.

This game has not received any official playable ports, but it does appear in the museum portion of Game & Watch Gallery 3, showcasing a simple and non-interactive demo.

Bomb SweeperBomb Sweeper was released in the Multi Screen series on June 15, 1987. It is a dual-screen single-player game with a clamshell case.

The player character is John Solver, who must navigate a maze to defuse bombs set by "Jack". When playing on "Game A" mode, the maze begins to move from left to right after a certain number of bombs are defused, and the player must find an exit back to the surface. The top screen is merely cosmetic, and shows the boss who sends the player character into the underground maze. Unlike in most Game & Watch games, lost lives are not reset when a player reaches 300 points.Bomb Sweeper was recreated in Game & Watch Gallery 4 for Game Boy Advance.

SafebusterSafebuster was released in the Multi Screen series on January 12, 1988. It is a dual-screen single-player game with a clamshell case.

A security guard on the bottom screen uses a tube to catch bombs thrown by a bandit on the top screen. The tube is able to hold three bombs, which can be dumped down a chute at either side of the bottom screen for 1 point each. A life is lost for each bomb missed. The game ends when three lives are lost.Safebuster was recreated in Game & Watch Gallery 4 for Game Boy Advance.

Gold CliffGold Cliff was released in the Multi Screen series on October 19, 1988. It is a dual-screen single-player game. It has a light blue clamshell case with colorful printed metal plate on the cover.

The player controls an Indiana Jones-type archaeologist character who is on a mission to acquire treasure. Stone platforms appear and disappear in a pattern, and the player must jump across them to reach a key at the top of the screen and gain entry to the temple. Action speeds as the game continues. It was one of only two Game & Watch games that included a "continue" feature, which allowed a player to continue the game, with a loss of points, from the last place where they were killed.

ZeldaZelda was released in the Multi Screen series on August 26, 1989. It is a dual-screen single-player game with a clamshell case.Zelda was recreated in Game & Watch Gallery 4 for Game Boy Advance. It was rereleased in the Nintendo Mini Classics.

Mario the JugglerMario the Juggler is the last Game & Watch game released in the New Wide Screen series on October 14, 1991. It is a single-screen single-player game. The gameplay is similar to that of the first Game & Watch game, Ball.

Super Mario Bros. 35th Anniversary Edition

This limited 35th Anniversary Edition Game & Watch version of Super Mario Bros. has a full-color pixel screen. It has several modes: NES versions of Super Mario Bros. and Super Mario Bros.: The Lost Levels; another new Mario-themed variant of Ball which looks very different from Mario the Juggler; and traditional Game & Watch clock features. The size and shape of the hardware is similar to the Wide Screen series, plus a cross-shaped d-pad like the Donkey Kong model. It was released on November 13, 2020.

The Legend of Zelda 35th Anniversary Edition

This limited edition 35th Anniversary Edition Game & Watch version of The Legend of Zelda has a full-color pixel screen. It has several modes that include the NES/Famicom versions of The Legend of Zelda and Zelda II: The Adventure of Link in various languages, both Japanese and International GB versions of The Legend of Zelda: Link’s Awakening in various languages, a new Zelda-themed variant of Vermin which looks very different from the Zelda (Game & Watch), playable timer and playable traditional Game & Watch'' clock. The size and shape of the external hardware is similar to the Game & Watch Wide Screen series, plus a cross-shaped d-pad like on the Zelda (Game & Watch). The official release date was November 12, 2021.

External links
All Nintendo Game & Watch LCD Games part1 and part2 at YouTube

References

 issue 4/2005 page 73

 
Nintendo-related lists
Video game lists by platform
Video game prequels
Prequels